Robert C. McNeish (July 15, 1912 – February 27, 1999) was an American football player and coach.  He served as the head football coach at Virginia Polytechnic Institute and State University from 1948 to 1950, compiling a record of 1–25–3.  The lone win came against Richmond in 1949.  McNeish played college football as a halfback at the University of Southern California (USC) from 1931 to 1933.  His teams, coached by Howard Jones, went 30–2–1 in those three seasons, winning national championships and consecutive Rose Bowls in 1931 and 1932.  McNeish served as an assistant coach at USC and at the United States Naval Academy.  He died on February 27, 1999, in San Gabriel, California.

Head coaching record

College

References

External links
 

1912 births
1999 deaths
American football halfbacks
Navy Midshipmen football coaches
USC Trojans football coaches
USC Trojans football players
Virginia Tech Hokies football coaches
Junior college football coaches in the United States
Pasadena City Lancers football coaches